Gary Roger Mielke (born January 28, 1963), is a retired American right-handed pitcher in Major League Baseball who played three seasons for the Texas Rangers (and ). Prior to his Major League career, Mielke played for Minnesota State University in Mankato. On August 24, 1989, Mielke notched his only career save, against the Oakland Athletics. He preserved the win for Mike Jeffcoat by going 2 2/3 scoreless innings to close out a 6-2 Rangers victory.    On June 21, 1989, Mielke picked up his only MLB victory, against the Boston Red Sox. The losing pitcher that day was seven-time Cy Young Award winner Roger Clemens.  Mielke would go on to pitch in relief for Texas during the 1990 season, but was granted free agency on November 15, 1990. During 1991, Mielke again pitched in the Rangers' minor league system, then that of Oakland, but this marked his final professional season.

References

External links

1963 births
Living people
Major League Baseball pitchers
Baseball players from Minnesota
Texas Rangers players
Gulf Coast Rangers players
Tulsa Drillers players
Salem Redbirds players
Oklahoma City 89ers players
Tacoma Tigers players
Huntsville Stars players
Minnesota State Mavericks baseball players
People from St. James, Minnesota

Minnesota State University, Mankato alumni